Sydney Tafler (31 July 1916 – 8 November 1979) was an English actor who after having started his career on stage, was best remembered for numerous appearances in films and television from the 1940s to the 1970s.

Personal life
Tafler was born into a Jewish family, the son of Eva (née Kosky) and Mark Tafler, an antique dealer. His sister, Hylda, married the film director Lewis Gilbert. Another sister, Sheila, was also an actress.

He was married to the actress Joy Shelton from 1941 until his death from cancer; they had three children – two sons, Jeremy and Jonathan, and a daughter, Jennifer, who became a child actress.

Career
After two years at the Royal Academy of Dramatic Art, Tafler first appeared on stage in London's West End in 1936, with Sir Seymour Hicks in The Man in Dress Clothes. His other stage roles included the menacing character of Nat Goldberg in a production of Harold Pinter's The Birthday Party, directed by the playwright; a role he reprised in William Friedkin's 1968 film version, alongside Robert Shaw and Patrick Magee.

On British television he appeared alongside Sid James in Citizen James. His other television work included Angel Pavement, The Gentle Killers, The Infernal Machine, Focus, Dixon of Dock Green, Wodehouse Playhouse, and Hadleigh. He appeared in many films from 1947 to 1977, including The Lavender Hill Mob, The Sea Shall Not Have Them, and Alfie, frequently being directed by his brother-in-law Lewis Gilbert.

He most commonly played spiv characters, one notable exception being the film   Reach for the Sky (1956) in which he played the prosthetics expert to Douglas Bader. There again, he appeared briefly in a drily comic role as a uniformed policeman in the film The Cockleshell Heroes (also 1956). His film career ended with a featured role as the captain of the supertanker Liparus in the popular James Bond film The Spy Who Loved Me (1977).

Selected filmography

Film

Cottage to Let (1941) as RAF Officer (uncredited)
The Little Ballerina (1947) as (uncredited)
It Always Rains on Sunday (1947) as Morry Hyams
Uneasy Terms (1948) as Maysin
London Belongs to Me (1948) as Nightclub Receptionist
No Room at the Inn (1948) as Stranger
The Monkey's Paw (1948) as The Dealer
Broken Journey (1948), uncredited, final scene.
Passport to Pimlico (1949) as Fred Cowan
Dance Hall (1950) as Manager
Once a Sinner (1950) as Jimmy Smart
Assassin for Hire (1951) as Antonio Riccardi
Scarlet Thread (1951) as Marcon
The Galloping Major (1951) as Mr. Leon
The Lavender Hill Mob (1951) as Clayton
Chelsea Story (1951) as Fletcher Gilchrist
Hotel Sahara (1951) as Corporal Pullar
Mystery Junction (1951) as Larry Gordon
Blind Man's Bluff (1952) as Rick Martin
Secret People (1952) as Syd Burnett
Wide Boy (1952) as Benny
Emergency Call (1952) as Brett
Time Gentlemen, Please! (1952) as Joseph Spink
Venetian Bird (1952) as Boldesca
The Floating Dutchman (1952) as Victor Skinner
There Was a Young Lady (1953) as Johnny
Johnny on the Run (1953) as Harry
The Square Ring (1953) as 1st Wiseacre
The Saint's Return (1953) as Max Lennar
Operation Diplomat (1953) as Wade
The Crowded Day (1954) as Alex
The Sea Shall Not Have Them (1954) as Cpl. Robb
The Glass Cage (1955) as Rorke
A Kid for Two Farthings (1955) as Madam Rita
The Woman for Joe (1955) as Butch
The Cockleshell Heroes (1955) as Policeman
Dial 999 (1955) as Alf Cressett
The Long Arm (1956) as Stone
Fire Maidens from Outer Space (1956) as Dr. Higgins
Reach for the Sky (1956) as Robert Desoutter
The Counterfeit Plan (1957) as Harry Flint
Interpol (1957) as Curtis
The Surgeon's Knife (1957) as Dr. Hearne
Carve Her Name with Pride (1958) as Potter
The Bank Raiders (1958) as Bernie Shelton
Too Many Crooks (1959) as Solicitor
The Crowning Touch (1959) as Joe
Follow a Star (1959) as Pendlebury
Tommy the Toreador (1959) as Ramon (uncredited)
Sink the Bismarck! (1960) as First Workman
Bottoms Up (1960) as Sid Biggs
Let's Get Married (1960) as Pendle
Light Up the Sky! (1960) as Ted Green
Make Mine Mink (1960) as Lionel Spanager
The Bulldog Breed (1960) as Speedboat Owner
Five Golden Hours (1961) as Alfredo 
No Kidding (1961) as Mr. Rockbottom
Carry On Regardless (1961) as Strip Club Manager
A Weekend with Lulu (1961) as Stationmaster
The 7th Dawn (1964) as Tom. Chief Petty Officer
Promise Her Anything (1965) as Panel Participant
Runaway Railway (1965) as Mr. Jones
Alfie (1966) as Frank
The Sandwich Man (1966) as First Fish Porter
Berserk! (1967) as Harrison Liston
The Birthday Party (1968) as Nat Goldberg 
The Adventurers (1970) as Col. Gutierrez
The Spy Who Loved Me (1977) as Liparus captain

Television

 BBC Sunday-Night Theatre (1950-1957, 8 episodes) as Harry Soames / George Ware / Professor Frey / Alexander Lopakhin / Chauvelin / Petronius Arbiter / Dorn / Chauvelin
 Back to Methuselah (1952, 2 episodes) as Ghost of Cain / Cain
 Your Favorite Story (1953, 1 episode)
 ITV Play of the Week (1955, 1 episode) as Nacky
 Theatre Royal (1955, 1 episode)
 Angel Pavement (1957-1958, 4 episodes) as Mr. Golspie
 Educated Evans (1957, 1 episode) as Morry Green
 The Gentle Killers (1957, 6 episodes)
 ITV Television Playhouse (1957-1960, 3 episodes) as Gregor / Charlie / Landrieu
 East End, West End (1958, 1 episode)
 Dick and the Duchess (1958, 2 episodes) as Giuseppe
 Theatre Night (1958, 1 episode) as Pedro Juarez
 Dial 999, ( including the 'Night Mail', and 'The Big Fish', episodes, plus one more)-(1958-1959, 3 episodes) as Pete / Smiler Harris / Mick Coletta
 Alfred Marks Time (1959, 1 episode)
 Playhouse 90 (1959, 1 episode) as Club Manager
 The Third Man (1959-1962, 2 episodes) as George Freeman / Colonel Abu Said
 Whack-O! (1959, 1 episode) as Harrison Jessel
 Glencannon (1959, 1 episode) as Mr. Daninds
 Citizen James (1960-1962, 31 episodes) as Charlie Davenport
 Boyd Q.C. (1960, 1 episode) as De Viani
 The Larkins (1960, 1 episode) as Sidney Foskett
 Knight Errant Limited (1960, 1 episode) as Angelo Broza
 Danger Man (1960, 1 episode) as Mikhail Radek
 A Christmas Night with the Stars (1960, 1 episode) as Charlie Davenport - with Sid James
 No Hiding Place (1961-1965, 3 episodes) as Marty Cook / Charlie Monkton / Lew Hemming
 The Arthur Askey Show (1961, 2 episodes) as Oscar Lamouche
 Three Live Wires (1961, 1 episode)
 Hamlet (1961, 5 episodes) as Claudius
 Here's Harry (1961, 1 episode)
 Deadline Midnight (1961, 1 episode) as Bluey Roxon
 Comedy Playhouse (1962, 1 episode) as Lionel
 Z Cars (1963-1974, 5 episodes) as Ray Dawson / Willy Tyndale / Wasilewski / Ray Dawson / Oliver Snow
 A World of His Own (1964, 1 episode)
 Gideon's Way (1964, 1 episode) as Gabriel Lyon
 Dixon of Dock Green (1964-1969, 3 episodes) as Mr. Green / Peter Cassidy / Ralph Edwards
 Front Page Story (1965, 1 episode) as Waterman
 A Slight Case of... (1965, 1 episode)
 Theatre 625 (1966, 2 episodes) as Shamrayef / Finkelstein
 The Wednesday Play (1966-1970, 2 episodes) as Blaustein / Arthur Bradshaw
 Sam and Janet (1967, 1 episode) as Mr. Spalding
 The World of Wooster (1967, 1 episode) as Jas. Waterbury
 Man in a Suitcase (1968, 1 episode) as Reynolds
 The Ugliest Girl in Town (1968, 1 episode) as Bert Pooley
 Me Mammy (1969, 1 episode) as Sir Gerald Bronstein
 Hadleigh (1969, 1 episode) as Zinneman
 Coronation Street (1969, 2 episodes) as Mr. Maddox-Smith
 W. Somerset Maugham (1970, 1 episode) as Sir Adolphus Bland
 Misleading Cases (1971, 1 episode) as Mr. Benkle
 Alexander the Greatest (1971-1972, 13 episodes) as Joe Green
 The Adventurer (1973, 1 episode) as Wyvern
 Love Story (1973, 1 episode) as Mr. Miller
 Van der Valk (1973, 3 episodes) as Halsbeek
 Some Mothers Do 'Ave 'Em (1973, 1 episode) as Lockwood
 Play for Today (1973-1977, 2 episodes) as Harry Perlman / Mr. Crowley
 Vienna 1900 (1974, 1 episode) as Herr Klingemann
 Marked Personal (1974, 1 episode) as Cartwright
 Village Hall (1974, 1 episode) as Arthur Bolton
 Churchill's People (1975, 1 episode) as Haskelot
 Crown Court (1975, 1 episode) as Harry Simons
 The Sweeney (1975, 1 episode) as Manny Bellow
 Wodehouse Playhouse (1975-1976, 2 episodes) as Isadore Q. Fishbein
 Yes, Honestly (1976, 1 episode) as Harry Burton
 Survivors (1976, 2 episodes) as Manny
 Victorian Scandals (1976, 1 episode) as Achille Fould
 Thriller (1976, 1 episode) as Sam Meadows
 Do You Remember? (1978, 1 episode) as Ambrose Solto
 Devenish (1978, 1 episode) as Sidney Bloom
 Potter (1979, 1 episode) as Harry Tooms
 Cannon and Ball (1979, 1 episode) as The Agent
 BBC2 Playhouse (1980, 1 episode) as Kugelmann
 The Enigma Files (1980, 1 episode) as Solly King (final appearance)

References

External links 
 
 Performances listed in Theatre Archive University of Bristol

1916 births
1979 deaths
Jewish English male actors
English male film actors
English male television actors
Male actors from London
English Jews
20th-century English male actors
Alumni of RADA